David Oliver may refer to:

 David Oliver (actor) (1962–1992), American actor
 David Oliver (doctor) (born 1966), British geriatrician
 David Oliver (flautist) (1972–2012), Scottish musician and professor
 David Oliver (hurdler) (born 1982), American athlete
 David Oliver (ice hockey) (born 1971), Canadian ice hockey player in the NHL
 David Oliver (singer) (1942–1982), R&B singer
 David R. Oliver Jr. (born 1941), executive of the European Aeronautic Defense and Space Company for North America
 David W. Oliver (1819–1905), American politician
 Dave Oliver (born 1951), infielder and coach in Major League Baseball
 David "Ollie" Oliver, member of defunct British pop band Point Break
 David C. Oliver, computer scientist and founder of Cambridge Systems Technology
 David Oliver, American former police officer and radio personality: See